Éverton dos Santos Lopes (born August 8, 1988 in Salvador, Bahia) is a Brazilian professional boxer best known for his sensational 2011 World title win when he was still an amateur. Lopes is also a two-time Olympian, two-time Pan American Games medalist (silver in 2007 and bronze in 2011) and 2013 AIBA World Boxing Championships bronze medalist.

Career
At the 2006 South American Games the 18-year-old Lopes lost the final to Darley Perez. He won the Pan American Junior Championships but lost the quarterfinal at the World Junior Championships 2006 to eventual winner Roniel Iglesias, 24:39. In the final of the 2007 Senior Pan American Games he lost to Cuban world champion Yordenis Ugás.

In 2007, he had two professional MMA fights in Brazil, losing to Alexandre Aranha by Submission and defeating Edmilson Domingos.

He won the 2008 Dominican tournament "Copa Independencia" vs. local Jonathan Batista who had beaten him in the final the year before. At the first Olympic qualifier he lost again to Ugas, at the second he beat fighters like Francisco Vargas to qualify for Beijing. There, fighting at lightweight, he was upset by little-known Asylbek Talasbaev 7:9.

After this he moved up to light welterweight.

At his 2011 World Amateur Boxing Championships win he beat Ukrainian Denys Berinchyk in the final by a score of 26 - 23.

At the 2012 Olympics he ran right into Cuban Roniel Iglesias and lost 15:18.

Lopes has also competed in the sport of MMA, going 1-1.

Professional boxing record 

| style="text-align:center;" colspan="8"|6 Wins (2 knockouts, 4 decisions),  0 Losses, 0 Draws
|-  style="text-align:center; background:#e3e3e3;"
|  style="border-style:none none solid solid; "|Res.
|  style="border-style:none none solid solid; "|Record
|  style="border-style:none none solid solid; "|Opponent
|  style="border-style:none none solid solid; "|Type
|  style="border-style:none none solid solid; "|Rd., Time
|  style="border-style:none none solid solid; "|Date
|  style="border-style:none none solid solid; "|Location
|  style="border-style:none none solid solid; "|Notes
|- align=center
|Win||6–0
|align=left|  Eduardo Rafael Reyes
|
|
|
|align=left|  
|align=left|
|- align=center
|Win||5–0
|align=left| Daniel Bastien
|
|
|
|align=left| 
|align=left|
|- align=center
|Win||4–0
|align=left| Omar Tienda
|
|
|
|align=left| 
|align=left|
|- align=center
|Win||3–0
|align=left| Marcelo Ezequiel Mesa
|
|
|
|align=left|
|align=left|
|- align=center
|Win||2–0
|align=left| Robert Alexander Seyam
|align=center|
|
|
|align=left| 
|align=left|
|- align=center
|Win||1–0
|align=left| Evan Woolsey
|
|
|
|align=left|
|align=left|

References

External links 
 

1988 births
Living people
Brazilian male boxers
Lightweight boxers
Brazilian male mixed martial artists
Olympic boxers of Brazil
Boxers at the 2008 Summer Olympics
Boxers at the 2012 Summer Olympics
Pan American Games silver medalists for Brazil
Pan American Games medalists in boxing
Boxers at the 2007 Pan American Games
Boxers at the 2011 Pan American Games
South American Games silver medalists for Brazil
South American Games medalists in boxing
AIBA World Boxing Championships medalists
Competitors at the 2006 South American Games
Competitors at the 2010 South American Games
Medalists at the 2007 Pan American Games
Medalists at the 2011 Pan American Games
Sportspeople from Salvador, Bahia
21st-century Brazilian people